Bao Quach (born September 4, 1979) is an American featherweight professional mixed martial artist who has fought for Bellator, Affliction, M-1 Global, EliteXC, Strikeforce, World Extreme Cagefighting, King of the Cage, and Shooto promotions.

Background
Quach is originally from Huntington Beach, California, the son of Vietnamese parents, and attended Dana Hills High School where he excelled in wrestling and was a state qualifier. He continued wrestling at Cerritos College before earning a degree from Cal State Fullerton.

Affliction: Day of Reckoning
Bao Quach agreed to step in for Mark Hominick to face LC Davis at Affliction: Day of Reckoning as Hominick was forced off due to contracting pneumonia. This was Bao's first fight since coming back from his injury which cancelled his 140 lb EliteXC Featherweight Championship fight with Wilson Reis back in September. Quach lost the fight via unanimous decision.

Filmography and other media

Bao was featured in the video game “MMA Supremacy”

Mixed martial arts record

|-
| Win
| align=center| 19–10–1
| Alvin Cacdac
| Submission (triangle/armbar)
| M-1 Challenge 30: Zavurov vs. Enomoto
| 
| align=center| 1
| align=center| 3:33
| Costa Mesa, California, United States
| 
|-
| Win
| align=center| 18–10–1
| Jeff Willingham
| TKO (punches)
| Lords of Combat – Lords of SoCal: Round 1
| 
| align=center| 1
| align=center| 2:40
| Irvine, California, United States
| 
|-
| Loss
| align=center| 17–10–1
| Georgi Karakhanyan
| KO (knee and punches)
| Bellator 13
| 
| align=center| 1
| align=center| 4:05
| Hollywood, Florida, United States
| 
|-
| Win
| align=center| 17–9–1
| Aaron Miller
| Submission (armbar)
| Respect in the Cage
| 
| align=center| 2
| align=center| 1:44
| Pico Rivera, California, United States
| 
|-
| Win
| align=center| 16–9–1
| Tito Jones
| Decision (unanimous)
| Strikeforce Challengers: Evangelista vs. Aina
| 
| align=center| 3
| align=center| 5:00
| Fresno, California, United States
| 
|-
| Loss
| align=center| 15–9–1
| LC Davis
| Decision (unanimous)
| Affliction: Day of Reckoning
| 
| align=center| 3
| align=center| 5:00
| Anaheim, California, United States
| 
|-
| Win
| align=center| 15–8–1
| Mark Oshiro
| Decision (unanimous)
| ICON Sport: Hard Times
| 
| align=center| 3
| align=center| 5:00
| Honolulu, Hawaii, United States
| Wins Icon Sport 140 lb North American Championship
|-
| Win
| align=center| 14–8–1
| Armando Sanchez
| Submission (kimura)
| CXF: Uprising in Upland
| 
| align=center| 1
| align=center| 0:50
| Upland, California, United States
| 
|-
| Win
| align=center| 13–8–1
| Doug Evans
| TKO (punches)
| ShoXC: Elite Challenger Series
| 
| align=center| 1
| align=center| 0:55
| Friant, California, United States
| 
|-
| Win
| align=center| 12–8–1
| Bobby McMaster
| Decision (unanimous)
| ShoXC: Elite Challenger Series
| 
| align=center| 3
| align=center| 5:00
| Atlantic City, New Jersey, United States
| 
|-
| Win
| align=center| 11–8–1
| Chris David
| Decision (unanimous)
| KOTC: Arch Rivals
| 
| align=center| 3
| align=center| 5:00
| Reno, Nevada, United States
| 
|-
| Win
| align=center| 10–8–1
| Tenkei Fujimiya
| Decision (split)
| Shooto: The Arrival: This is Shooto
| 
| align=center| 3
| align=center| 5:00
| Irvine, California, United States
| 
|-
| Win
| align=center| 9–8–1
| Del Hawkins
| TKO (elbows)
| IFO: Eastman vs. Kimmons
| 
| align=center| 1
| align=center| 4:52
| Las Vegas, Nevada, United States
| 
|-
| Win
| align=center| 8–8–1
| Rex Payne
| KO (punch)
| No Limits: Proving Ground
| 
| align=center| 1
| align=center| 1:34
| Irvine, California, United States
| 
|-
| Win
| align=center| 7–8–1
| Armando Sanchez
| TKO (punches)
| Invincible: Fist of Fury II
| 
| align=center| 1
| align=center| 1:01
| Ontario, California, United States
| 
|-
| Loss
| align=center| 6–8–1
| Wagnney Fabiano
| KO (head kick)
| APEX: Evolution
| 
| align=center| 1
| align=center| 4:50
| Quebec, Canada
| 
|-
| Draw
| align=center| 6–7–1
| Hatsu Hioki
| Draw
| Shooto: Gig Central 9
| 
| align=center| 3
| align=center| 5:00
| Aichi Prefecture, Japan
| 
|-
| Loss
| align=center| 6–7
| Rumina Sato
| Submission (armbar)
| Shooto Hawaii: Souljah Fight Night
| 
| align=center| 1
| align=center| 3:03
| Honolulu, Hawaii, United States
| 
|-
| Loss
| align=center| 6–6
| Hideki Kadowaki
| Submission (rear naked choke)
| Shooto - Year End Show 2003
| 
| align=center| 3
| align=center| 4:40
| Chiba, Japan
| 
|-
| Win
| align=center| 6–5
| Cole Escovedo
| Decision (split)
| Gladiator Challenge 15
| 
| align=center| 2
| align=center| 5:00
| Porterville, California, United States
| 
|-
| Win
| align=center| 5–5
| Naoya Uematsu
| Decision (unanimous)
| Shooto - Treasure Hunt 10
| 
| align=center| 2
| align=center| 5:00
| Kanagawa Prefecture, Japan
| 
|-
| Loss
| align=center| 4–5
| Jeff Curran
| Decision (majority)
| WEC 4
| 
| align=center| 3
| align=center| 5:00
| Uncasville, Connecticut, United States
| 
|-
| Win
| align=center| 4–4
| David Padilla
| Decision (unanimous)
| Warriors Quest 6: Best of the Best
| 
| align=center| 2
| align=center| 5:00
| Honolulu, Hawaii, United States
| 
|-
| Loss
| align=center| 3–4
| Richard Crunkilton
| KO (punches)
| UA 2: The Gathering
| 
| align=center| 2
| align=center| 1:20
| Cabazon, California, United States
| 
|-
| Loss
| align=center| 3–3
| David Yeung
| Decision (majority)
| Warriors Quest 3: Punishment in Paradise
| 
| align=center| 2
| align=center| 5:00
| Honolulu, Hawaii, United States
| 
|-
| Loss
| align=center| 3–2
| Juliano Prado
| Submission (choke)
| GC 8: School Yard Brawls
| 
| align=center| 3
| align=center| 3:01
| Friant, California, United States
| 
|-
| Win
| align=center| 3–1
| Kenny Tenorio
| Submission (armbar)
| KOTC 9: Showtime
| 
| align=center| 1
| align=center| 2:54
| San Jacinto, California, United States
| 
|-
| Loss
| align=center| 2–1
| Greg Mayer
| KO (punches)
| KOTC 8: Bombs Away
| 
| align=center| 1
| align=center| 0:17
| Williams, California, United States
| 
|-
| Win
| align=center| 2–0
| Dave Hisquierdo
| Decision (unanimous)
| GC 3: Showdown at Soboba
| 
| align=center| 3
| align=center| 5:00
| Friant, California, United States
| 
|-
| Win
| align=center| 1–0
| Joe Camacho
| Decision (split)
| GC 2: Collision at Colusa
| 
| align=center| 3
| align=center| 5:00
| Friant, California, United States
|

See also
List of male mixed martial artists

References

External links

 BaoQuach.com
 RoundersMMA

Living people
1979 births
American male mixed martial artists
American Muay Thai practitioners
American male sport wrestlers
American practitioners of Brazilian jiu-jitsu
People awarded a black belt in Brazilian jiu-jitsu
Featherweight mixed martial artists
Mixed martial artists utilizing Muay Thai
Mixed martial artists utilizing collegiate wrestling
Mixed martial artists utilizing Brazilian jiu-jitsu
Sportspeople from Huntington Beach, California
Sportspeople of Vietnamese descent
American sportspeople of Vietnamese descent
American male child actors
American male film actors
People from Irvine, California